Nimi  McConigley (née Swamidoss) is an Indian American politician who served in the Wyoming State Legislature from 1994 until 1996. McConigley, who was born in Madras, was the first Indian born person and the first  Indian American woman  to serve in any State legislature.

Instead of running for re-election, Rep. McConigley chose to run for United States Senate. In the Republican primary, she finished 4th out of 9 candidates, behind Michael Enzi, John Barrasso, and Curt Meier.

She had previously been only one of two Asian American news directors when she took that role at CBS affiliate KGWC in Casper, Wyoming after graduating from the Columbia University school of journalism.
She did her schooling in Doveton Corrie School in Vepery. She received a bachelor's degree in Arts from Queen Mary's College and her law degree from the Madras Law College. She later studied Journalism at the Columbia University. She married Patrick McConigley and has two daughters, Lila and Nina.

See also
Asian American Journalists Association
List of Indian Americans

References

External links
Bobby Jindal wins from Louisiana The Tribune, Chandigarh - 4 November 2004
What political breakthrough? Rediff - 15 January 2003
Martin, Mart.The Almanac of Women and Minorities in American Politics 2002. Westview Press, 2001. 

Living people
Indian emigrants to the United States
Women state legislators in Wyoming
American Tamil politicians
Columbia University Graduate School of Journalism alumni
Year of birth missing (living people)
Politicians from Chennai
Republican Party members of the Wyoming House of Representatives
American politicians of Indian descent
Asian-American people in Wyoming politics
20th-century American politicians
20th-century American women politicians
21st-century American women
Asian conservatism in the United States